Isabella Fazekas Jacobsen (born 24 December 1997) is a Danish handball player for Holstebro Håndbold.

References 

Danish female handball players
1997 births
Living people
Handball players from Copenhagen